The third season of the television sitcom Brooklyn Nine-Nine premiered September 27, 2015 on Fox and ended April 19, 2016 with 23 episodes.

Summary
Following the kiss that Jake and Amy had, the two decide to pursue a real relationship. The Nine-Nine gets a new captain, Seth Dozerman (Bill Hader) who dies of a heart attack after seeing Jake and Amy kissing. The Vulture assumes command of the precinct, but Holt retakes it thanks to Jake after the two of them catch a serial killer. Charles begins a relationship with Genevieve, an art curator who was framed for insurance fraud. Terry's wife gives birth to their third daughter, Ava, on Thanksgiving. 

Rosa breaks up with Marcus and begins a new relationship with Adrian Pimento, a detective who's been undercover for 12 years. Rosa and Adrian get engaged, but Adrian is forced to go into hiding when Jimmy "The Butcher" Figgis tries to have him killed by someone tied to the FBI. Amy goes undercover in a women's prison in Texas to find out which FBI informant is tied to Figgis and discovers it was Holt's former partner that they were working the case with, Bob Annderson. They capture Bob and use his knowledge to take down most of Figgis' empire. Jake receives a call from Figgis threatening his and Holt's lives, forcing the two to go to witness protection in Florida.

Cast

Main
 Andy Samberg as Jake Peralta
 Stephanie Beatriz as Rosa Diaz
 Terry Crews as Terry Jeffords
 Melissa Fumero as Amy Santiago
 Joe Lo Truglio as Charles Boyle
 Chelsea Peretti as Gina Linetti
 Andre Braugher as Raymond Holt

Starring
 Dirk Blocker as Michael Hitchcock
 Joel McKinnon Miller as Norm Scully

Recurring
 Dean Winters as Keith "The Vulture" Pembroke
 Kyra Sedgwick as Deputy Chief Madelyn Wuntch
 Jason Mantzoukas as Adrian Pimento

Guest
 Bill Hader as Captain Seth Dozerman
 Archie Panjabi as Lieutenant Singh 
 Neil deGrasse Tyson as himself
 Mary Lynn Rajskub as Genevieve
 Nick Offerman as Frederick
 Nick Cannon as Marcus
 Kathryn Hahn as Eleanor
 Craig Robinson as Doug Judy
 Bradley Whitford as Captain Roger Peralta
 Katey Sagal as Karen Peralta
 Damon Wayans Jr. as Detective Stevie Schillens
 Aida Turturro as Maura Figgis
 Dennis Haysbert as Bob Annderson
 Anders Holm as Soren Knausgaard
 Riki Lindhome as Agneta Carlsson

Episodes

Reception

Critical response
The third season received positive reviews to critical acclaim, although a few audiences found it inferior to the second season. Review aggregator website Rotten Tomatoes reports a 93% approval rating, with an average score of 8.19/10, based on 14 reviews. The website's consensus reads, "Brooklyn Nine-Nines third season smartly sidesteps the pitfalls of romantically linking two central characters while also expounding on the series' joy for clever gags and hard-earned camaraderie."

Awards and nominations

References

External links
  at Fox
 

 
2015 American television seasons
2016 American television seasons
Brooklyn Nine-Nine